Red Robin was an American comic book ongoing series, written by Chris Yost with art by Ramon Bachs, featuring former Robin Tim Drake under the identity of Red Robin. The debut of the series follows the events of Batman R.I.P., Final Crisis, and Battle for the Cowl in which the original Batman, Bruce Wayne, apparently died at the hands of DC Comics villain Darkseid. Of all the characters in the so-called "Batman family", Drake (now using his legal name, Tim Wayne) is the only one that believes Bruce Wayne is still alive and leaves Gotham City to begin a global search for evidence supporting his theory and hope.

Slated characters 
DC Comics Batman line editor Mike Marts revealed characters slated to appear in Red Robin by showing his "wall" of character thumbnails underneath the various Batman titles. Characters slated to appear in Red Robin other than Tim Drake include Gotham City reporter Vicki Vale and one of Bruce Wayne's longtime enemies Ra's al Ghul.

Azrael 
In October 2010, Red Robin tied-in indirectly to the Azrael comic through the use of Ra's al Ghul, who was testing those involved with Bruce Wayne to become his ultimate warrior.

Red Robin artist Ramon Bachs left Red Robin to take on Azrael with Fabian Nicieza, in turn he finished "The Grail" and gave Marcus to his debut in DC to draw the next four issue arc "Council of Spiders".

Despite the backstories of both comics relying heavily on the League of Assassins and both stories converging at times, the initial run of Batman: Reborn did not have the two comics officially having a tie-in. The two did eventually tie-in in the overarching "Gotham Shall Be Judged" storyline, when Red Robin would end up facing Azrael's Angels of Death.

Plot

Collision 
With Bruce Wayne’s apparent death, Tim Drake takes on the costumed identity of Red Robin.  He is determined to find Bruce Wayne, who Tim is convinced is alive.

Tim Drake travels around the world, looking for clues to where Bruce Wayne lives. After rescuing a hostage, he retires to his hotel room, frustrated. A flashback is shown of Tim Drake leaving Wayne Manor after losing the Robin mantle to Damian Wayne. Outside his window, Z, Owens, and Prudence, watch and take aim at him with a sniper rifle. The three assassins are in league with Ra's Al Ghul, who gives the order to assassinate Tim Drake.

The hotel room explodes from the shot, but Red Robin appears and attacks the three. Tim demonstrates his new fighting style and deduces the identities of the assassins before they disappear. Soon after, Red Robin comes into contact with Ra's Al Ghul, who is interested to learn what has happened to Bruce Wayne. Red Robin #3 begins when Tim Drake attempts to steal what appears to be a fossilized Batarang while consulting with Ra's Al Ghul. Another flashback is shown, with Tim standing in front of Bruce Wayne's grave, when Wonder Girl approaches to console him and persuade him to return home. Tim, however, deduces that Dick Grayson sent her to check on him and makes her leave him alone.

The last issue of the first arc alternates between a Red Robin and Batman fighting each other and Tim's discovery of Bruce Wayne's cave painting at the end of Final Crisis. At the end of the first arc, Red Robin is stabbed by a villain named the Widower, leaving him and Prudence for dead and setting the stage for the second story arc.

The second story arc, Council of Spiders, deals with Red Robin having to face off against the Council of Spiders, a group of assassins who have made it their goal to destroy the League of Assassins. Red Robin makes a shakey alliance with the League, and after they have dealt with the council, he destroy's the League's global computer system, earning the ire of Ra's al Ghul.

The third story arc, entitled "Collision", sees Red Robin enlisting the help of the new Batman (Dick Grayson), Robin (Damian Wayne), and Batgirl (Stephanie Brown), in order to stop Ra's al Ghul from destroying the Wayne Family legacy, in which he (Red Robin) succeeds. Red Robin is nearly killed by Ra's al Ghul when he confronts him, who, after seeing that his plan has failed, addresses Red Robin as "detective", a title of respect which he had reserved for Bruce Wayne alone. Ra's throws Red Robin off of a very high building, but Red Robin is saved by the timely arrival of Dick Grayson as Batman.

The Hit List 
The next story arc, entitled "The Hit List", sees Red Robin working alongside the new Batman and Robin to fight the crime in Gotham, but he does it his own way. He sets up a list of people he suspects being the biggest threats on both sides. This causes even more tension in the relationship between him and the new Robin (Damian Wayne). He is seen taking down a new gang leader named Lynx who seems to be his potential Catwoman. The reporter Vicky Vale is being on his toes as Tim Drake seems to know what the Bat-families real identities are. He works hard to fake being shot and now being unable to walk properly simply to put her off his trail. He also has a brush in with Anarky and some other low class villains. He also visits Cassandra Cain. This is also an opening to Batman Inc. showing his involvement in it.

Gotham Shall Be Judged 
Following the invasion of Gotham City via Azrael and his Angels of Death, Red Robin teams up with the new Batman, Dick Grayson to fight against Azrael. Tim is tested by Azrael to see if he is able to save the lives of innocents, a test which he, like Dick, ends up failing. At the end, it is revealed that in revenge for destroying the base of the League of Assassins, Ra's al Ghul was manipulating Azrael to get him to face off with Red Robin.

Despite the Azrael and Red Robin book heavily referencing each other during Batman: Reborn, even having the same backplot involving the League of Assassins, it was not until near the end of the latter's comic that they officially tied in, and the former's was already ended.

Outfit
Red Robin's outfit, from comics #1-12, was a black cape and cowl over a red shirt with two bands running diagonally across his chest, containing his symbol in the middle. His belt ran over his shirt and he had black gloves on. He also wore long black pants with black boots. At the end of 
Red Robin #12, Alfred made some slight changes to his outfit to make it more his own. Alfred updated the gloves and boots, gave him a cape he could glide with, a new belt, and he took the ends of the shirt off. However, in September 2011, DC comics rebooted the main universe. Tim Drake is now the leader of the Teen Titans. His symbol is now on his left shoulder, and he has a wing-like cape to help him glide. He now wears a domino mask instead of a cowl.

Collected editions

See also
Batman: Reborn

Notes

References

External links

Robin (character) titles
Comics by Christopher Yost